The TRIAL is a Czech music band that existed from 1988 to 1993. The band was found in Beroun (Czech Republic) from where their music spread through recordings, concerts and other media to whole Czechoslovakia.  A musical genre of The TRIAL was called technopop (or synthpop). The band itself espoused to the legacy of electronic pop scene of the 1980s. Emphasis of their work lied in working in studio and sound experimenting. The TRIAL released two singles and two albums and also three videoclips for TV and two concerts shows. As the top of the success became the encouragement from the British DJ John Peel, which personally invited the band to England and played the songs of The TRIAL on BBC Radio One and Radio Luxembourg. In 2009, MaxOne created for the band two video clips and remixed their unpublished tracks "Let’s Shake Down" and "Pull It Back".

There is another German-Turkish-Swiss experimental/new wave band called The Trial, that was established 1985 in Berlin and is active since then.

Discography

Albums and singles
"In The Fiction Press" - 1990
Pictures - 1991
"No Love in Future" - 1991
"You And Darkness" - 1992
"Let’s Shake Down" - 2009
"Pull It Back" - 2009

Video clips
Terrible Scream - 1988
In The Fiction Press - 1990
Sex Story - 1991
Let’s Shake Down - 2009
Pull It Back - 2009

References

External links
 Official homepage of The TRIAL
 The TRIAL on MySpace
 Musicserver.cz

Electronic music groups